José Lluis (13 December 1937 – 4 October 2018) was a Spanish basketball player and coach. He competed for Spain in the men's tournament at the 1960 Summer Olympics.

Honours
Real Madrid Baloncesto
 Liga Española (3): 1959–60, 1960–61, 1961–62
 Copa del Rey de Baloncesto (3): 1960, 1961, 1962
Club Joventut Badalona
 Liga Española: 1966–67
 Copa del Rey de Baloncesto: 1969
Spain
 Mediterranean Games runner-up: 1959, 1963

References

External links
 

1937 births
2018 deaths
Spanish men's basketball players
Olympic basketball players of Spain
Basketball players at the 1960 Summer Olympics
Basketball players from Barcelona
Point guards